John Lyden Scott (born 31 March 1934) is an Australian politician. He was an Australian Labor Party member of the Australian House of Representatives from 1980 to 1993.

Scott was born in Hamilton, Scotland.  He served in the Royal Air Force from 1955 to 1958.  After emigrating to Australia, he became active in the trade union movement, serving as a member of the Amalgamated Metal Workers and Shipwrights Union council from 1969 to 1980.

When longtime Labor power broker Clyde Cameron announced his retirement ahead of the 1980 federal election, Scott was elected his successor in the north Adelaide seat of Hindmarsh. Scott was subsequently re-elected to the same seat at the 1983, 1984, 1987 and 1990 elections.  Hindmarsh had long been one of the safest Labor seats in the country, but a 1984 redistribution made it slightly less secure for Labor. Demographic change during the 1980s made Labor's hold on the seat even more tenuous.  As a result, Scott's margins were nowhere near as large as the ones Cameron had tallied over the previous 31 years.

A redistribution ahead of the 1993 federal election merged much of the abolished seat of Hawker, based on Glenelg and Holdfast Bay, into Hindmarsh. This cut Scott's already slim majority of 5.3 percent to an extremely marginal 1.2 percent.  Additionally, the writs were dropped at a bad time for the South Australian state Labor government, which was hobbled by a massive debt load brought on by the collapse of the State Bank of South Australia. With these factors in mind, Scott retired at the end of his fifth term.

External links
 Biography for SCOTT, John Lyden

1934 births
Living people
Australian Labor Party members of the Parliament of Australia
Members of the Australian House of Representatives
Members of the Australian House of Representatives for Hindmarsh
Scottish emigrants to Australia
20th-century Australian politicians